Anger is an emotion.

Anger may also refer to:

Places
Anger, Bavaria, a town in Germany
Anger, Austria, a town in Styria, Austria
Anger (river), in France

People
Anger (surname)

Film and TV
Anger (film), a 2016 Japanese film
Anger, a character in the film Inside Out

Music
Anger (album), a 1986 album by Sandy Lam
"Anger", a 1979 single by Marvin Gaye from Here, My Dear
"Anger" (downset. song), originally called "Social Justice"
"Anger", a song from Cleanse Fold and Manipulate by Skinny Puppy

Other uses
Gamma camera, also called an Anger camera

See also
St. Anger, a studio album by Metallica

Angers (disambiguation)
Angry (disambiguation)